Polypeptide N-acetylgalactosaminyltransferase 14 is an enzyme that in humans is encoded by the GALNT14 gene.

GALNT14 (EC 2.4.1.41) belongs to a large subfamily of glycosyltransferases residing in the Golgi apparatus. GALNT enzymes catalyze the first step in the O-glycosylation of mammalian proteins by transferring N-acetyl-D-galactosamine (GalNAc) to peptide substrates.[supplied by OMIM]

SNPs on GALNT14 have been shown to be associated to the chemotherapy responses of patients with advanced hepatocellular carcinoma.

References

Further reading